Familiar Wife is a romantic fantasy South Korean television series starring Ji Sung, Han Ji-min, Jang Seung-jo, and Kang Han-na. It aired on tvN from August 1 to September 20, 2018.

Synopsis
A married couple suddenly finds themselves living entirely different lives after their fates magically change through an unexpected incident.

Cha Joo-hyuk works at a bank and has been married to Seo Woo-jin for five years. When a strange incident happens one day, Joo-hyuk makes a decision that impacts his life and those around him in unexpected ways. Suddenly, the life he had with Woo-jin and his best friend, Yoon Joong-hoo are gone and he is leading a very different life.

How will his first love, Lee Hye-won, factor into his new life? And will it be possible to get his old life back?

Cast

Main
 Ji Sung as Cha Joo-hyuk
An ordinary bank employee that becomes unhappy with his life because of his family's financial struggle and constantly being pressured by both wife at home and his direct superior at office.
 Han Ji-min as Seo Woo-jin
A married woman who tries her best to balance between career and family life. She has been married to Joo-hyuk for five years. During those years, she developed anger issues and easily gets agitated with her husband's simple mistakes.
 Jang Seung-jo as Yoon Joong-hoo
Joo-hyuk's best friend who is also an ordinary bank employee with handsome face. His life is changed completely along with Joo-hyuk due to an unexpected incident. 
 Kang Han-na as Lee Hye-won
Cha Joo-hyuk's first love but due to an incident with Woo-jin, both of them became separated. She is a daughter of an influential businessman and also a cello player.

Supporting

People around Cha Joo-hyuk
 Park Hee-von as Cha Joo-eun, Joo-hyuk's sister who tries to pass a bar examination
 Oh Eui-shik as Oh Sang-sik, Joo-hyuk's friend who owns a noodle shop and works there alone

People around Seo Woo-jin
 Lee Jung-eun as Woo-jin's mother with severe alzhemizer's disease. Woo-jin decided to put her in a nursing home because of her worsening situation.

Bank employees
 Son Jong-hak as Cha Bong-hee, Branch manager of the bank where Joo-hyuk works at. He is kind toward the employees of the branch, especially to Joo-hyuk because of the same surname.
 Park Won-sang as Byeon Sung-woo. Joo-hyuk's direct superior in the branch's loan department. Unlike Bong-hee, he consistently pressurizes his subordinates, especially Joo-hyuk.
 Cha Hak-yeon as Kim Hwan, New recruit at the branch and being assigned as Joo-hyuk's subordinate. He is seen slacking around and making mistakes, becomes a further burden to Joo-hyuk's office life.
 Kim Soo-jin as Jang Man-ok The supervisor of transfer department of the branch. 
 Kim So-ra as Joo Hyang-sook. Bank teller on the deposit team.
 Gong Min-jeung as Choi Hye-jung. Bank teller on the deposit team. 
 Kang Hui as Jung Min-soo, a security guard who is mostly seen handling rude customers

Special appearances
 Lee You-jin as Jung Hyun-soo
 Kang Ki-young as Park Yoo-sik. Bank customer (ep. 13)
 Jo Jung-suk as chef Kang Sun-woo (ep. 15)

Production
The first script reading was held on May 9, 2018 at the conference room of Studio Dragon's main office at the 17th floor of DDMC Building in Sangam-dong, Seoul, South Korea.

Original soundtrack

Part 1

Part 2

Part 3

Part 4

Part 5

Part 6

Viewership

Awards and nominations

References

External links
 

 Familiar Wife at Studio Dragon
 Familiar Wife at Chorokbaem Media
 

Korean-language television shows
TVN (South Korean TV channel) television dramas
2018 South Korean television series debuts
South Korean romance television series
South Korean fantasy television series
Television series by Studio Dragon
Television series by Chorokbaem Media
2018 South Korean television series endings
South Korean workplace television series